Reginald Marsh may refer to:

 Reginald Marsh (artist) (1898–1954), American painter
 Reginald Marsh (actor) (1926–2001), English comic actor
 Reginald Marsh (cricketer) (1897–1969), English cricketer

See also 
 Marsh (surname)